Alan MacNaughton may refer to:

Alan Macnaughton (1903–1999), Canadian politician
Alan MacNaughtan (1920–2002), British television actor